Foundations and Trends in Electronic Design Automation is a journal published by Now Publishers. It publishes survey and tutorial articles on all aspects of electronic design automation. The editor-in-chief is Radu Marculescu (Carnegie Mellon University).

Abstracting and indexing 
The journal is abstracted and indexed in:
 Inspec
 EI-Compendex
 Scopus
 CSA databases
 ACM Digital Library

External links 
 

Engineering journals
Now Publishers academic journals
English-language journals
Quarterly journals
Publications established in 2007